WBNM-LD (channel 50) is a low-power television station in Louisville, Kentucky, United States. The station is owned by Word Broadcasting Network, and operated by South Central Communications. Its transmitter is located in northeastern Floyd County, Indiana just off Indiana State Road 111 just west of Sellersburg.

History
The station's construction permit was granted on April 13, 1989 under the callsign W49AX. The calls were changed to W50CI in December 1998. The station signed on for the first time on June 7, 1994 as an over-the-air outlet of The Box, and remained with that network until WBXV-LP took over MTV2. W50CI became affiliated with the Home Shopping Network in the early 2000s. In 2013, the main channel became a translator of WBNA, with HSN moving to its second subchannel. W50CI-D became a Buzzr affiliate in March 2017, becoming the second television station in Kentucky to affiliate with that station over two years after the LD2 subchannel of Bowling Green Antenna TV affiliate WCZU-LD.

Programming
WBNM-LD airs the Buzzr network on its main channel with Digi-TV, Sonlife Broadcasting Network, Dabl, Decades, GEB Network, America's Voice, GetTV, Retro TV, and The Family Channel on its subchannels. Subchannel 50.07, in particular, is a split channel with GEB Network airing from midnight to noon and America’s Voice airing from noon to midnight. Subchannels 50.01, 50.02, 50.03, 50.08, 50.09, and 50.10 transmit in a 4:3 480i standard-definition picture with subchannels 50.04, 50.05, and 50.07 transmitting in a 16:9 480i widescreen standard-definition picture.

References

BNM-LD
Television channels and stations established in 1994
Low-power television stations in the United States
Buzzr affiliates
NewsNet affiliates